Elachista devexella is a moth of the family Elachistidae. It is found in Russia (the Southern Ural Mountains).

The wingspan is about 7.3 mm. The forewing ground colour is grey, mottled with brownish tips of the scales. There is a small somewhat darker brown spot in the middle of the wing at the fold, which is inwardly and outwardly narrowly bound by white.

References

devexella
Moths described in 2003
Endemic fauna of Russia
Moths of Europe